The 3rd Parliament of Upper Canada was opened 28 May 1801.  Elections in Upper Canada had been held in July 1800.  All sessions were held at Parliament Buildings of Upper Canada in York, Upper Canada.  This parliament was dissolved 14 May 1804.

This House of Assembly of the 3rd Parliament of Upper Canada had four sessions 28 May 1801 to 9 March 1804:

See also
Legislative Council of Upper Canada
Executive Council of Upper Canada
Legislative Assembly of Upper Canada
Lieutenant Governors of Upper Canada, 1791–1841
Historical federal electoral districts of Canada
List of Ontario provincial electoral districts

References

Further reading
Handbook of Upper Canadian Chronology, Frederick H. Armstrong, Toronto : Dundurn Press, 1985. 

03
1801 establishments in Upper Canada
1804 disestablishments in Upper Canada